The twenty-second season of the American crime-drama television series Law & Order: Special Victims Unit was ordered on February 27, 2020, by NBC. Set to air during the 2020–2021 television season, the season is produced by Wolf Entertainment and Universal Television; the showrunner is Warren Leight. The season premiered on November 12, 2020 and consists of only 16 episodes due to the COVID-19 pandemic in the United States, making it the shortest in the series. The season ended on June 3, 2021.

Cast and characters

Main
 Mariska Hargitay as Captain Olivia Benson
 Kelli Giddish as Senior Detective Amanda Rollins
 Ice-T as Senior Detective Sergeant Odafin "Fin" Tutuola
 Peter Scanavino as Assistant District Attorney Dominick "Sonny" Carisi, Jr.
 Jamie Gray Hyder as Officer / Junior Detective Katriona "Kat" Tamin
 Demore Barnes as Deputy Chief Christian Garland

Special guest stars
 Raúl Esparza as Defense Attorney (former Assistant District Attorney) Rafael Barba
 Tamara Tunie as Chief Medical Examiner Melinda Warner

Crossover stars
 Christopher Meloni as Senior Organized Crime Control Bureau Detective Elliot Stabler (crossing over with Law & Order: Organized Crime)
 Annabella Sciorra as Bronx Special Victims Unit Lieutenant Carolyn Barek (crossing over with Law & Order: Criminal Intent)

Recurring

 Ryan Buggle as Noah Porter-Benson
 Stephen Wallem as Nurse Rudy Syndergaard 
 Lou Martini Jr. as Defense Attorney Ron Freddo 
 Jessica Phillips as Defense Attorney (Ex Assistant District Attorney) Pippa Cox 
 Kathryn Kates as Judge Marlene Simons
 Jasmin Walker as Defense Attorney Marame Touissant
 Ashley Taylor Greaves as Officer Gabrielle Taylor
 Jennifer Esposito as Sergeant Phoebe Baker
 Michael Mastro as Judge D. Serani
 Betsy Aidem as Dr. Sloane
 Aida Turturro as Judge Felicia Catano
 Marisa Brau-Reyes as Defense Attorney Edwina Myerson
 Elizabeth Marvel as Defense Attorney Rita Calhoun
 Wentworth Miller as Assistant District Attorney Isaiah Holmes
 Matt Buechele as Officer Donnie Jones
 Will Vought as Defense Attorney Victor Franklin

 Isabel Gillies as Kathy Stabler, Stabler’s wife
 Allison Siko as Kathleen Stabler, Stabler’s second eldest daughter
 Jeffrey Scaperrotta as Richard "Dickie" Stabler, Stabler’s eldest son
 Blake Anthony Morris as Jayvon Brown
 Aime Donna Kelly as Internal Affairs Bureau Captain Renee Curry
 Nicola Rossi as Lily Bustani, Kat's cousin.
 Jorge Franco IV as Xavier Garcia, Lily's boyfriend. 
 Ethan Cutkosky as Henry Mesner
 James Morrison as Jim Rollins 
 Ari'el Stachel as Sergeant Hasim Khaldun 
 Bill Irwin as Dr. Peter Lindstrom
 Erin Anderson as Counselor April Andrews
 Andre De Shields as Keys
 Yvonna Kopacz-Wright as Dr. Darby Wilder
 Ernest Waddell as Ken Randall
 Migs Govea as Alejandro Pavel

Episodes

Production

Development
Law & Order: Special Victims Unit was renewed through its twenty-second season on February 27, 2020. The season marks the return of former main cast member Meloni as Elliot Stabler since the season 12 finale. Meloni stars in the new Law & Order spin-off Law & Order: Organized Crime. He was expected to appear in the season premiere of the twenty-second season, but, due to the COVID-19 pandemic in the United States, the premiere of the spin-off was pushed back to 2021, delaying his appearance to the mid-season.

In the wake of the rise in awareness of police brutality towards people of color and racial unrest in America, show runner/executive producer Warren Leight said that he has been making changes in the SVU writers' room, stating that "change will start taking place on TV shows individually. There will be lip service paid". In addition to bringing on new voices, including people of color and those who have extensive history covering and writing about crime in New York, Leight said that "[They've] tried really hard in the last year to show how class and race affect the outcomes of justice in society, but I'm beginning to suspect "really hard" wasn't enough. This has to be a moment where people make themselves uncomfortable, where people in power have to make themselves uncomfortable".

On October 6, 2020, it was announced Barnes would be promoted to main cast as Deputy Chief Christian Garland; he had a recurring role on the previous season.

Filming
Filming for the season started on Monday, September 14, 2020. Two days prior, Hargitay posted two photos on her Instagram of the SVU cast and crew doing a read-through of the premiere episode script on a Zoom chat and of the script itself with the title of the episode, "Remember Me in Quarantine". On September 14, Hargitay posted two more pictures to her Instagram, one showing crew and cast members waiting in line to get COVID-19 tests and the other a photo of herself in the makeup chair with a gowned and masked makeup artist doing her hair and makeup. NBCUniversal developed a comprehensive return to work playbook, which is being followed by all of the company's series. It involves reducing shift hours and adding days to shoots to accommodate strict COVID-19 protocols. On April 27, 2021, filming for the twenty-second season concluded.

Storylines
The twenty-second season has addressed the pandemic, which led to reports of an increase in domestic abuse in New York. "We're going to reflect New York in the pandemic" and "what happens to someone who is sexually assaulted during the height of the coronavirus outbreak", said showrunner/executive producer Leight. The pandemic had a direct impact on the cast and crew, as the show lost a member of the costume department, Josh Wallwork, who died at age 45 of complications due to COVID-19.

Leight told TV Insider that in the sixth months that the series had last filmed (March 2020), New York City is "a city that has lost faith in the NYPD and the DA's office", and that the season premiere episode starts with an assault in Central Park that "quickly turns into a racially volatile situation, and [the unit] confronts how their own racial bias affects their judgment". After a case about domestic violence, the episode "Remember Me in Quarantine" turns to what happens after extended social isolation and quarantine due to COVID-19 — or, Leight said, "how close people get to their breaking points". He also told TV Insider "we hope to bring back some [more] past regulars this season", in addition to Christopher Meloni's guest return later in the season.

The series is also expected to cover police brutality towards African Americans, following the murder of George Floyd by a police officer and the subsequent global protests. Leight weighed in back in June 2020, that "we will find our way in to tell the story. Presumably our cops will still be trying to do the right thing but it's going to be harder for them and they're going to understand why it's hard for them".  According to co-star Ice-T, the SVU writers have been "touched by this" incident and he thinks their emotional connection to it

Ratings

Notes

References

22
2020 American television seasons
2021 American television seasons
Television productions postponed due to the COVID-19 pandemic